is a private boys' high school in Kōhoku-ku, Yokohama, Japan. It is affiliated with Keio University.

Overview 
The Keio High Schools No. 1 (第一高等学校) and No. 2 (第二高等学校) merged into Keio SHS in 1948.  its student body was 2,200.

Notable alumni

Politicians
Shigeru Ishiba
Nobuteru Ishihara
Hirotaka Ishihara
Shintaro Ito
Tatsuya Ito
Taku Otsuka
Motohiro Ono
Shinsuke Okuno
Zentaro Kamei
Taro Kono
Keizo Takemi
Wataru Takeshita
Kenji Kosaka
Hirofumi Nakasone
Tokihiro Nakamura
Makoto Nishida
Nobuo Kishi
Shigefumi Matsuzawa
Yorihisa Matsuno
Akihisa Nagashima
Yoshio Sakurauchi
Masaaki Itokawa
Yoichiro Esaki
Otohiko Endo
Seiichi Ota
Koji Sato

Businessmen
Hiroaki Aoki
Yotaro Kobayashi
Kakutaro Kitashiro
Takeo Shiina
Osamu Nagayama
Harunori Takahashi
Mochio Umeda
Akio Toyoda
James Kondo

Academics
Seiichiro Katsura
Masaru Tomita
Naoyuki Agawa
Ken Sakamura
Hitoshi Nagai
Takayuki Ohira

Writers
George Abe
Hiroshi Onogi
Heinosuke Gosho, film director and screenwriter

Actors
Koji Ishizaka
Yujiro Ishihara
Yoshizumi Ishihara
Takanori Iwata
Ichikawa Ennosuke III
Yuzo Kayama
Hiroshi Kawaguchi
Yusuke Kawazu
Takeshi Kusaka
Hiroshi Koizumi
Keisuke Koide
Katsuhiko Nakagawa

Musicians
Yuji Ohno
Takahiro Konagawa
Asei Kobayashi
Sho Sakurai
Akira Jimbo
Akira Senju
Izumi Tateno
Isao Tomita
Masataka Matsutoya
Takashi Matsumoto
Takashi Yoshimatsu

Artists
Shoji Kawamori
Hiroshi Senju
Michio Hoshino, photographer
Fujihiko Hosono, mangaka
Haruhiko Mikimoto
Yohji Yamamoto, fashion designer

Announcers
Taro Kimura
Sosuke Sumitani
Mitsuhiro Nakamura

Sportsmen
Tsunekazu Takeda, equestrian
Kiyohide Kuwata, basketball player
Shuzo Matsuoka, tennis player
Ryo Miyake, fencer
Shoma Sato, swimmer

Baseball players
Tomoaki Sato
Akihiro Hakumura
Taisei Tsurusaki
Tatsuru Yanagimachi

Rugby union players
Hisataka Ikuta
Taku Inokuchi

Footballers
Ken Tokura
Yoshinori Muto
Hiroshi Ninomiya
Hiroshi Katayama

Others
Ichiro Fujisaki, bureaucrat
Ikuo Hayashi, Aum Shinrikyo member

See also
Keio University

References

External links

 Keio Senior High School 
 English information

1948 establishments in Japan
Educational institutions established in 1948
Keio University
Private schools in Japan
High schools in Yokohama
Boys' schools in Japan
Art Deco architecture in Japan